Craig Neil Erickson (born May 17, 1969) is a former professional quarterback who was selected by the Philadelphia Eagles in the fifth round of the 1991 NFL Draft and also by the  Tampa Bay Buccaneers in the fourth round of the 1992 NFL Draft. He is one of the few NFL players to be drafted twice (Bo Jackson is another example). Coincidentally, each was drafted by the Tampa Bay Buccaneers. Prior to entering the NFL, Erickson played college football for the University of Miami.

College career
Erickson attended Cardinal Newman High School in West Palm Beach and then the University of Miami. A 6'2",  quarterback from the University of Miami who was the starting quarterback on Miami's 1989 National Championship squad, he ranked third on the Hurricanes all-time career passing-yardage list with 6,056 yards. 

Erickson played in 34 games over a four-year career, taking over starting role as a junior. He won the Johnny Unitas Golden Arm Award in 1990.

Statistics

Professional career
Erickson played in seven National Football League season seasons, from 1992 to 1998. His best year as a pro came during the 1993 season for the Tampa Bay Buccaneers, when he threw for over 3,000 yards and 18 touchdowns.

Erickson is known as one of the few professional athletes outside of baseball who came back from Tommy John surgery.

References

External links
 

1969 births
Living people
American football quarterbacks
Chicago Bears players
Indianapolis Colts players
Miami Dolphins players
Miami Hurricanes football players
Tampa Bay Buccaneers players
Sportspeople from Boynton Beach, Florida
Players of American football from Florida